Kemal Ademi (born 23 January 1996) is a Swiss professional footballer who plays as a centre-forward for German  club SV Sandhausen on loan from Russian club Khimki.

Club career

Neuchâtel Xamax
On 5 July 2018, Ademi signed his first professional contract with Swiss Super League side Neuchâtel Xamax after agreeing to a one-year deal with the option of continuation for another year. After a month, he made his debut as professional footballer in a 3–0 away defeat against Sion after coming on as a substitute at 46th minute in place of Tunahan Cicek.

Basel
On 15 June 2019, Ademi signed a four-year contract with Swiss Super League club Basel. Ademi joined Basel's first team for their 2019–20 season under head coach Marcel Koller. One month later, after playing in three test games, he was named as a Basel substitute for the first time in a league match against Sion but did not play. He played his debut with in the team four days later in the 2019–20 UEFA Champions League second qualifying round against the Dutch side PSV Eindhoven in the Philips Stadion on 23 July 2019. He came on as a substitute in the 89th minute, replacing Albian Ajeti. Four days after debut, on 27 July, he scored his first goal for his new club in the home game in the St. Jakob Stadium. But this could not help the team, as Basel were defeated 1–2 by St. Gallen.

Ademi left the club during the transfer window of the next season. During his short period with the club, Ademi played a total of 52 games for Basel scoring a total of 16 goals. 26 of these games were in the Swiss Super League, five in the Swiss Cup, three in the Champions League, ten in the Europa League and eight were friendly games. He scored 13 goals in the domestic league, one in the Swiss Cup and the afore mentioned goal in the Champions League. The other were scored during the test games.

Fenerbahçe
On 5 October 2020, Ademi signed a three-year contract with Süper Lig club Fenerbahçe and received squad number 99. Thirteen days later, he was named as a Fenerbahçe substitute for the first time in a league match against Göztepe. His debut with Fenerbahçe came seven days later in a 3–1 home win against Trabzonspor after coming on as a substitute at 88th minute in place of Mbwana Samatta. One month after debut, Ademi scored his first goal for Fenerbahçe in his fourth appearance for the club in a 4–0 home win over Sivas Belediyespor.

Loan at Fatih Karagümrük
On 1 February 2021, Ademi was loaned to Süper Lig side Fatih Karagümrük until the end of the season. Two days later, he made his debut in a 2–0 home win against Gaziantep after being named in the starting line-up.

Khimki
On 10 August 2021, Ademi signed a three-year contract with Russian Premier League club Khimki and received squad number 9. Six days later, he made his debut in a 3–0 away defeat against Sochi after coming on as a substitute at 83rd minute in place of Denis Glushakov.

On 16 August 2022, Ademi moved to SV Sandhausen in Germany for the 2022–23 season.

International career
Ademi was born in Villingen-Schwenningen, Germany and raised in Herisau, Switzerland to Kosovan parents from Prizren. He was eligible for Kosovo, Albania and Switzerland internationally, as well as Germany, his birthplace. On 25 June 2020, the Swiss Football Association announced that FIFA accepted Ademi's request to play for Switzerland after staying in the country for almost fourteen years.

Career statistics

Club

References

External links

1996 births
People from Villingen-Schwenningen
Sportspeople from Freiburg (region)
Footballers from Baden-Württemberg
Swiss people of Kosovan descent
German emigrants to Switzerland
German people of Kosovan descent
Living people
Swiss men's footballers
German footballers
Kosovan footballers
Association football forwards
TSG 1899 Hoffenheim II players
Neuchâtel Xamax FCS players
FC Basel players
Fenerbahçe S.K. footballers
Fatih Karagümrük S.K. footballers
FC Khimki players
SC Paderborn 07 players
SV Sandhausen players
Swiss Promotion League players
Regionalliga players
Swiss Super League players
Süper Lig players
Russian Premier League players
2. Bundesliga players
Swiss expatriate footballers
Kosovan expatriate footballers
German expatriate footballers
Kosovan expatriate sportspeople in Switzerland
German expatriate sportspeople in Switzerland
Swiss expatriate sportspeople in Turkey
Kosovan expatriate sportspeople in Turkey
German expatriate sportspeople in Turkey
Expatriate footballers in Turkey
Swiss expatriate sportspeople in Russia
Kosovan expatriate sportspeople in Russia
German expatriate sportspeople in Russia
Expatriate footballers in Russia